Come and Blow the Horn (approximately The herding lass) is a 1978 Swedish pornographic fantasy comedy film directed by Joseph W. Sarno, using the pseudonym Lawrence Henning, and produced by Sture Sjöstedt. The film is set in rural Dalarna. It was shot in Skattungbyn outside of Orsa, and was first screened in Orsa in September 1978, and later had its Swedish premiere in the pornographic theater Fenix in Stockholm on 25 September 1978.

The film has gained notoriety in Sweden, particularly the horn blowing sequence and the masturbation scene where an actress uses a sizable sausage (falukorv) as a dildo.
The film's soundtrack includes the traditional gånglåt "Äppelbo gånglåt".

Plot 
The film takes place in rural Dalarna. A legend surrounding an old horn that is kept in a building states that the instrument was brought along by the vikings on their travels. As they returned home, they would blow the horn, and the village women would come down to the beach to meet their men and make love. The farm girl Monika blows the horn and finds that it indeed causes the local women to get sexually aroused.

Cast 
 Leena Hiltunen – Monika Skoglund
 Anita Berglund – Britt Kindberg
 Marie Bergman – Agneta Johansson
 Knud Jörgensen – Olle Hansson

International titles 
 Come and Blow the Horn (UK)
 Come and Blow the Horn (US)
 Hot Swedish Summer (English version)
 Walthorn (West Germany)

References

External links 
 
 

1970s pornographic films
Films directed by Joseph W. Sarno
Swedish pornographic films
Swedish comedy films
1970s Swedish-language films
1978 films
Films set in Dalarna
Films shot in Sweden
1970s Swedish films